Melverley railway station was a station in Melverley, Shropshire, England. The station was opened in 1871 and closed in 1933.

References

Further reading

Disused railway stations in Shropshire
Railway stations in Great Britain opened in 1871
Railway stations in Great Britain closed in 1933